is a district in Kushiro Subprefecture, Hokkaido, Japan. It includes Akan National Park, which has many dormant volcanoes.

Towns and villages 
Tsurui

Merger 
On October 11, 2005, the town of Akan, along with the town of Onbetsu (from Shiranuka District), merged into the expanded city of Kushiro.

External links

Districts in Hokkaido